Water skiing at the 2010 Asian Beach Games was held from 14 December to 15 December 2010 in Muscat, Oman.

Medalists

Trick skiing

Wakeboarding

Medal table

Results

Trick skiing

Men's individual
14–15 December

Women's individual
14–15 December

Team overall
14–15 December

Wakeboarding

Men's individual

Quarterfinals
14 December

Last chance qualifiers
14 December

Semifinals
15 December

Final
15 December

Women's individual

Quarterfinals
14 December

Last chance qualifiers
14 December

Semifinals
15 December

Final
15 December

Team overall
14–15 December

References 

Official Site

2010 Asian Beach Games events
2010
Asian